is a Japanese manga series by Fujiko Fujio and later Fujiko F. Fujio about the titular obake, Q-Taro, who lives with the Ōhara family. Q-Tarō, also known as "Q-chan" or "Oba-Q", is a mischief-maker who likes to fly around scaring people and stealing food, though he is deathly afraid of dogs.

The story is usually focused on the antics of Q-Tarō and his friends. The manga was drawn in 1964–1966 by the duo Fujiko Fujio (Hiroshi Fujimoto and Motoo Abiko) and in 1971–1974 by just Hiroshi Fujimoto (as Fujiko F. Fujio). An English manga volume was published in Japan as Q the Spook.

There are three anime series adaptations of Obake no Q-Tarō. The first was shown on the Tokyo Broadcasting System (TBS) in black and white, and ran from 1965 to 1967. The second series, produced in color, ran from 1971 to 1972 on Nippon TV. The third series ran from 1985 to 1987 on TV Asahi. The series was broadcast in the United States in the 1970s as Little Ghost Q-Taro, making it one of only two works by Fujiko F. Fujio to be localized in English.

Characters

Voiced by: Machiko Soga (1965), Junko Hori (1971), Fusako Amachi (1985)
The protagonist of the manga, Q-Tarō has a fear of dogs and cannot transform although he is an obake.

Voiced by: Kazue Tagami (1965), Yoshiko Ōta (1971), Katsue Miwa (1985)
A human friend of Q-tarō, Shōta Ōhara is an elementary school student. Q-Tarō calls him  and Shota calls Q-Tarō .

Voiced by: Masako Nozawa (1965), Sumiko Shirakawa (1971), Yū Mizushima (1985)
Shota's older brother. He is a middle school student.

Voiced by:  Hiroko Maruyama (1971), Eiko Masuyama (1985)
U-ko, a judoka, is Q-Tarō's girlfriend obake.

Voiced by: Misae Kita (1965), Yoshiko Yamamoto (1971), Fuyumi Shiraishi (1985)
Doronpa is an American obake. Q-Tarō tends to have a rivalry towards him due to the fact that U-ko idolizes Doronpa's intelligence and he likes to annoy Q-Tarō because he is Japanese.

Voiced by: Yōko Mizugaki (1965), Kazuko Sawada (1971), Yūko Mita (1985)
P-ko is Q-Tarō's younger sister.

Voiced by: Makoto Kōsaka→Reiko Katsura (1971), Keiko Yokozawa (1985)
 O-jirō is Q-Tarō's younger brother. Although he can understand others' speech, he can only say "bakeratta." Only Q-Tarō understands what O-jirō says.

 Father of Q-Tarō, P-ko, and O-jirō.

 Mother of Q-Tarō, P-ko, and O-jirō.

Voiced by: Kaneta Kimotsuki (1965/1971), Hiroshi Takemura (1985)
Nickname: Godzilla. A bully in Shota's class and neighborhood.

Voiced by: Mitsuko Aso (1965), Sumiko Shirakawa (1971), Kaneta Kimotsuki (1985), Naoki Tatsuta (1985, stand-in)
Shota's smart classmate.

Voiced by: Unknown (1965), Kazuko Sawada (1971), Naoki Tatsuta (1985)
Shota's rich classmate who kisses up to Godzilla. His name is also similar to the rich boy in Kaibutsu-kun

Voiced by: Mariko Tsukai (1965), Michiko Nomura (1971), Sanae Miyuki (1985)

Voiced by: Unknown (1965), Unknown (1971), Yoko Asagami (1985)
Shin'ichi's girlfriend. She is a middle school student, and P-ko lives with her

Voiced by: Hiroshi Ōtake (1965), Akira Shimada (1971), Shingo Hiromori (1985)
Ramen chief character, he also appears too as a ramen chief in Doraemon, he appears as a teacher in Ninja Hattori-kun, he appears as a Michio's father in Ultra B

Voiced by: Reizo Nomoto (1965) and (1971), Shingo Kanemoto (1985)
Ohara's neighbor and Doronpa lives with him. And he resembles from Doraemon

Reception and impact

The popularity of the 1965 anime adaptation caused a cultural phenomenon called "Oba-Q boom" (オバQブーム Oba-Kyū būmu), which made the series have an 30% audience rating, high popularity with children and spawn a variety of Toys, songs and clothes, as well a host of imitators. The reason of Q-Tarō's popularity was that the series was grounded in everyday Japanese life, with Q-Tarō questioning the structure of Japanese society and the comedic situations that occurred because of Q-Tarō misinterpreting it.

Pac-Man creator Toru Iwatani cited the series as inspiration for the designs of the Ghosts in the Pac-Man video game series. In the manga series To Love Ru, the ghost character Shizu Murasame has a fear of dogs as an homage to Little Ghost Q-Taro.

Notes

References

External links
60s 
70s 
80s 

1960s Japanese television series
1964 manga
1965 anime television series debuts
1971 anime television series debuts
1985 anime television series debuts
Anime series based on manga
Children's manga
Comedy anime and manga
CoroCoro Comic
Fictional ghosts
Fujiko Fujio
Japanese comedy television series
Nippon TV original programming
Shin-Ei Animation
Shogakukan manga
Shogakukan franchises
Shōnen manga
Shunsuke Kikuchi
TMS Entertainment
TBS Television (Japan) original programming
TV Asahi original programming